Shrek Retold is a fan-made reanimated collab film based on the 2001 film Shrek. Released on November 29, 2018 to YouTube, the project was led by YouTuber Grant Duffrin ("3GI", best known for hosting an annual Shrek festival in Milwaukee since 2014).

It features the work of over 200 creators, each contributing to a portion of the recreation.

Plot 

Shrek is an anti-social and highly-territorial ogre who loves the solitude of his swamp. His life is interrupted after the dwarfish Lord Farquaad of Duloc exiles a vast number of fairy-tale creatures, who inadvertently end up in the swamp. Angered by the intrusion, Shrek decides to visit Farquaad and demand they be moved elsewhere. He reluctantly allows the talkative Donkey, who was exiled as well, to tag along and guide him to Duloc.

Meanwhile, Farquaad is presented with the Magic Mirror, which tells him that in order to become a king, he must marry a princess. Farquaad chooses Princess Fiona, who is imprisoned in a tower guarded by a dragon. Unwilling to perform the task himself, he organizes a tournament, in which the winner will receive the "privilege" of rescuing Fiona on his behalf. Shrek and Donkey arrive at Duloc during the tournament. Disgusted by Shrek, Farquaad announces that whoever kills the ogre will be crowned the victor; however, Shrek and Donkey defeat Farquaad's knights with relative ease. An amused Farquaad proclaims them champions and demands that they rescue Fiona. Shrek negotiates to have the fairy-tale creatures relocated if he succeeds, and Farquaad accepts.

Shrek and Donkey travel to the castle and are attacked by the Dragon. Shrek locates Fiona, who is appalled by his lack of romanticism; they flee the castle after rescuing Donkey. When Shrek removes his helmet and reveals he is an ogre, Fiona stubbornly refuses to go to Duloc, demanding Farquaad arrive in person to save her; Shrek carries her against her will. That night, after setting up camp and with Fiona alone in a cave, Shrek confides with Donkey about his frustration with being feared and rejected by others over his appearance. Fiona overhears this and decides to be kind to Shrek. The next day, they encounter Robin Hood and his band of Merry Men; Fiona dispatches them easily with martial arts after they harass the group. Shrek becomes impressed with Fiona, and they begin to fall in love.

When the trio nears Duloc, Fiona takes shelter in a windmill for the evening. Donkey later enters alone and discovers that Fiona has transformed into an ogre. She explains she has been cursed since childhood, forced to transform into an ogre every night, and changing back at sunrise. She tells Donkey that only "true love's kiss" will break the spell and change her to "love's true form". Meanwhile, Shrek is about to confess his feelings to Fiona, when he overhears Fiona referring to herself as an "ugly beast". Believing that Fiona is talking about him, Shrek angrily leaves and returns the next morning with Farquaad. Confused and hurt by Shrek's abrupt hostility, Fiona accepts Farquaad's marriage proposal and requests they be married before nightfall.

Shrek abandons Donkey and returns to his now-vacated swamp. He quickly realizes that despite his privacy, he feels miserable and misses Fiona. Donkey arrives at the swamp and confronts Shrek. During their quarrel, Donkey explains that the "ugly beast" Fiona was referring to was someone else, and urges him to express his feelings for Fiona before she marries. The two reconcile and quickly travel to Duloc by riding Dragon, who Donkey has befriended. Shrek interrupts the wedding just before the ceremony completes and tells Fiona that Farquaad is only marrying her to become king. The sun sets as Fiona transforms into an ogre in front of everyone, causing a surprised Shrek to understand what he overheard.

Outraged and disgusted, Farquaad orders Shrek executed and Fiona detained: The two are saved when Dragon, alongside Donkey, bursts in and devours Farquaad. Shrek and Fiona profess their love and share a kiss. Fiona's curse is broken, although this permanently makes her an ogre against her expectations; Shrek reassures her that he still finds her beautiful. They marry in the swamp with fairy-tale creatures in attendance, then leave for their honeymoon.

Format 
As a recreation, Shrek Retold follows the plot of the original film with only some deviations. The main difference between Shrek Retold and the original is in its reinterpretation; as a collaborative effort with over 200 contributors, the art style, voice acting, and music change from scene to scene, often being wildly different from the original. Unlike the original Shrek which is entirely 3D animated, Shrek Retold features 2D and 3D animation, live action, stop-motion, and other mediums. The film's contributors include many internet personalities and actors, such as David Liebe Hart, Michael Cusack, Ratboy Genius, Anthony Fantano, SiIvaGunner, and a webcomic artist.

Production and release 

Shrek Retold was produced as collaborative, but segmented effort; director Grant Duffrin split the film into different scenes of varying length, and each scene was recreated by a contributor. In an interview with Quartz, Duffrin stated his love of Shrek was genuine, contrary to the "ironic" Shrek internet memes of the time. Shortly prior to release, a trailer for the film was uploaded to the 3GI channel which received significant news coverage. The film premiered on YouTube to a live audience on November 29, 2018, and has since remained on the site. On November 29, 2019, it was announced that the film would be available for purchase in VHS format and as a free digital download. In March 2020, Shrek Retold was followed up by Sonic Rebuilt, a similar recreation of the 1999 Sonic the Hedgehog film.

Reception 
Shrek Retold was received well by critics, who mainly praised its impressive scope for a fan project and its bizarre content.

Soundtrack 

The soundtrack was released on streaming services and cassette for the film's first anniversary on 29, November 2019. It features covers of songs featured in the original Shreks soundtrack and additional original songs written specifically for the project.

Upcoming Shrek 2 Retold project 
Originally, on April 1, 2019, 3GI posted an April Fools video titled Shrek 2 Retold in which the project director discussed the creation of Shrek Retold. During Shrekfest 2019 it was announced that Shrek 2 Retold was no longer just a joke and is actually happening via an animated announcement trailer. The Shrek 2 Retold Twitter posts public updates about the project. On April 22, 2021, as a celebration of the twentieth anniversary of the original film, 3GI posted an official teaser trailer of Shrek 2 Retold.

See also 

 Reanimated collab

References

External links 
 Shrek Retold on YouTube
 

Remakes of American films
Films about donkeys
Films about dragons
Films about princesses
Films with live action and animation
Films using stop-motion animation
Fan films
Shrek (franchise)
2018 films
Shot-for-shot remakes
Films released on YouTube
2010s English-language films